The 2020–21 George Mason Patriots Men's basketball team represented George Mason University during the 2020–21 NCAA Division I men's basketball season. The season marked the 55th for the program, the sixth under head coach Dave Paulsen, and the eighth as members of the Atlantic 10 Conference. The Patriots played their home games at EagleBank Arena in Fairfax, Virginia. The Patriots finished the season 13–9, 8–6 in A-10 play to finish in sixth place. They defeated George Washington in the second round of the A-10 tournament before losing to Davidson in the quarterfinals.

On March 16, 2021, the school fired Paulsen. A week later, the school named Tennessee assistant Kim English the team's new head coach.

Previous season
The Patriots finished the 2019–20 season 17–15, 5–13 in A-10 play to finish in twelfth place. The A-10 tournament was canceled after the first round due to the ongoing COVID-19 pandemic.

Offseason

Departures

2020 recruiting class

Source

Honors and awards
Atlantic 10 Rookie of the Year
 Tyler Kolek 

All Atlantic 10 Third Team
 Jordan Miller 

Atlantic 10 All-Defensive Team
 A.J. Wilson 

Atlantic 10 Player of the Week
 Josh Oduro - Feb. 22 

Atlantic 10 Rookie of the Week
 Tyler Kolek - Dec. 28 
 Tyler Kolek - Feb. 15 
 Tyler Kolek - Mar. 2

Roster

Player statistics

Schedule and results

|-
!colspan=12 style=| Non-conference regular season

|-
!colspan=12 style=|<span style=>A-10 regular season

|-
!colspan=12 style=| A-10 tournament

Source

References

George Mason
George Mason Patriots men's basketball seasons
George Mason men's basketball